Chapel-en-le-Frith Central railway station was an intermediate stop on the Derby–Manchester line of the Midland Railway. It served the Derbyshire town of Chapel-en-le-Frith between 1867 and 1967.

History
The station was opened by the Midland Railway (MR) on 1 February 1867.

At the start of 1923, the MR amalgamated with several other railways to form the London, Midland and Scottish Railway (LMS), which inherited two stations at Chapel-en-le-Frith; to distinguish the ex-MR station from the ex-London and North Western Railway station, the former was renamed Chapel-en-le-Frith Central on 2 June 1924.

The station was closed on 6 March 1967.

This section of route is still open for stone freight trains serving the Buxton lime industry as the Great Rocks Line, with the station building converted into a DIY centre.

Stationmasters
Samuel Rayson ca. 1871 - 1873 (afterwards station master at Hyde)
W. Webster 1873 - 1876 (formerly station master at Whatstandwell, afterwards station master at Calverley)
J. Hudston 1876 - 1879 (formerly station master at Monsal Dale)
J. Blower 1879 - 1880 (formerly station master at Finedon, afterwards station master at Didsbury)
David Daw 1880 - 1919 (formerly station master at Haworth)

References

External links
Chapel-en-le-Frith Central Station on navigable O.S. map
Chapel-en-le-Frith Central at disused-stations.org.uk

Disused railway stations in Derbyshire
Former Midland Railway stations
Railway stations in Great Britain opened in 1867
Railway stations in Great Britain closed in 1967
Beeching closures in England
Chapel-en-le-Frith